Kaithal district is one of the 22 districts of Haryana, a state in northern India. Kaithal town is the district headquarters. The district occupies an area of 2317 km2. It has a population of 1,074,304 (2011 census). It is part of Karnal division. Kaithal was notified as district by Haryana Govt. on 16 October 1989 and carved out of Kurukshetra and Jind districts, comprising Guhla and Kaithal sub-divisions of Kurukshetra district, Kalayat sub-tahsil and 6 villages of Jind district.

This district came into existence on 1 November 1989.

Divisions
Kaithal district comprises four tehsils: Kaithal, Guhla, Pundri and Kalayat; and the three sub-tehsils of Rajaund, Dhand and Siwan. The four Haryana Vidhan Sabha constituencies located in this district are Guhla, Kalayat, Kaithal and Pundri. All of these are part of Kurukshetra Lok Sabha constituency.

Demographics

According to the 2011 census Kaithal district has a population of 1,074,304, roughly more than the nation of Cyprus or the US state of Rhode Island. This gives it a ranking of 423rd in India (out of a total of 640). Its population growth rate over the decade 2001-2011 was 13.39%. Kaithal has a sex ratio of 880 females for every 1000 males, and a literacy rate of 70.6%. Scheduled Castes make up 23.04% of the population.

Languages 

At the time of the 2011 Census of India, 61.85% of the population in the district spoke Haryanvi, 26.48% Hindi and 10.42% Punjabi as their first language.

References

External links
Kaithal district, official website

 
Districts of Haryana
1989 establishments in Haryana